John W. Smith may refer to:
John Walter Smith (1845–1925), politician from Maryland
John William Smith (politician) (1792–1845), politician in the Republic of Texas
John William Smith (legal writer) (1809–1845), English barrister and legal writer
John W. Smith (Detroit mayor) (1882–1942), politician from Detroit
Sir John Wilson Smith (1920–1995), English business and former Liverpool F.C. chairman
John W. Smith, architect of Boise, Idaho, designer of Glenns Ferry School (1909)
John Smith (American wrestler), American wrestler, two-time Olympic gold medalist